Frank Doran may refer to:

 Frank Doran (aikido), Aikido teacher
 Frank Doran (American politician), former mayor of St. Paul, Minnesota, USA
 Frank Doran (British politician) (1949–2017), Scottish Member of UK Parliament